Paolo Achenza is an Italian jazz pianist from Bari and was one of the first Italian artists involved with the acid jazz scene. In the second half of the 1990s, he formed the Paolo Achenza Trio with Stefano Valenzano and Massimiliano Ingrosso to make various albums and singles.

In 2004, he joined the Groove Squared project with Paco DJ for the CD single release "The Single" (Kutmusic) and in 2005 an album on Evolution Music.

External links
 Paolo Achenza discography on Discogs.com

Year of birth missing (living people)
Living people
Italian jazz pianists
Italian male pianists
Schema Records artists
21st-century pianists
21st-century Italian male musicians
Male jazz musicians